The 2007 Weber State-Portland State football game was a college football game held on October 27 at PGE Park, now known as Providence Park, in Portland, Oregon. It pitted the Portland State Vikings against the Weber State Wildcats. The Wildcats defeated the Vikings 73–68. The two teams combined for 141 points, setting a National Collegiate Athletic Association (NCAA) all-division record for most points scored in a game.

This record lasted only two weeks, as on November 10, Hartwick defeated Utica 72–70 in a four-overtime Division III game. In the second round of the NCAA Division II playoffs on November 24, Chadron State defeated Abilene Christian 76–73 in three overtimes after coming back from a 49–20 fourth-quarter deficit to tie the game at 56 at the end of regulation. The following year, in the same round of the Division II playoffs, that record was smashed when Abilene Christian defeated West Texas A&M 93–68 on November 22, 2008. The Weber State-Portland State game held the record for most points scored in a Division I college football game, until November 24, 2018, when Texas A&M defeated LSU by a score of 74–72 in a seven-overtime game.

Game summary
Weber State scored 35 points in the second quarter to take a 38–27 lead at halftime. By then, the Wildcats already had 443 yards in total offense – 10 yards more than its previous season high for an entire game. Portland State made up for its shaky defense with a high-powered offense that started the second half with a pair of touchdown passes from Drew Hubel, first to David Lewis and then to Tremayne Kirkland, which put the Vikings in front 41–38. Portland State had its last lead of the game when Hubel hit Lewis with an 8-yard touchdown pass at 8:15 of the third quarter to make it 48–45. The Wildcats took the lead for good on their next possession, which chewed up nearly six minutes and culminated with Cameron Higgins 4-yard touchdown pass to Akamu Aki to make the score 52–48. Weber State followed that with Bryant Eteuati's 77-yard punt return for a touchdown and Higgins' 4-yard scoring run, which pushed the Wildcats' advantage to 66–48 early in the fourth quarter. The teams traded touchdowns after that, leaving Weber State in front 73–55 with 4:22 left. Hubel, who was making his first college start, threw his ninth touchdown pass and Andy Shantz returned a fumble 84 yards for a touchdown with 31 seconds left. Hubel's nine touchdown passes set a school and Big Sky Conference record, and also equaled the then-current Division I FCS record for single-game TD passes set in 1984 by Willie Totten of Mississippi Valley State. The Vikings failed to recover the onside kick and Weber State managed to run out the clock.

Portland State QB Drew Hubel's incredible individual performance – 35 completions in 56 attempts for 485 yards, 9 touchdowns and no interceptions – gave the true freshman one of College Sporting News' "Player of the Week" awards in the Football Championship Subdivision for the week of October 29, 2007.

Statistics

Footnotes

See also
1916 Cumberland vs. Georgia Tech football game – Georgia Tech 222, Cumberland 0 in a game played before the NCAA began keeping records and against a team that had dropped football.
2001 GMAC Bowl – the highest-scoring bowl game in history, both at the end of regulation and the end of the game.
2007 Navy vs. North Texas football game – featured the most points scored in a college football game involving NCAA Division I Football Bowl Subdivision opponents during the regulated four quarters of play.

References

2007 Big Sky Conference football season
vs. Portland State 2007
vs. Weber State 2007
Sports competitions in Portland, Oregon
October 2007 sports events in the United States
2007 in sports in Oregon
2007 in Portland, Oregon